I is the sixth studio album by Ikimono-gakari, released in Japan on July 24, 2013. It reached number one in the Oricon weekly charts for the week ending August 5 of that year making it the group's sixth consecutive number-one album. Consequently, Ikimono-gakari became the first mixed group in over seventeen years to achieve six consecutive number one albums on the Oricon weekly chart.

Release 
The album was released in Japan on July 24, 2013 in two editions.  The regular edition (ESCL-4091), had for its first pressings an Ikimono card #036 and a raffle ticket for additional prizes which included a T-shirt and a hand fan. The limited edition (ESCL-4089-90) included a DVD featuring a radio interview "イッキーモンキーのiラジオ" Ikkey Monkey's iRadio, a twelve-sided panorama photo shoot of the Ikimono-gakari members and a special box packaging to display pictures of the three members.

The album contains five previously released tracks; four of which are A-side singles: "Haru Uta", "Kaze ga Fuiteiru", "1 2 3 ~Koi ga Hajimaru~" and "Egao".  A fifth track, "Ashita no Sora", was the B-side to "1 2 3 ~Koi ga Hajimaru~".

Though to an extent a reference to the songwriters themselves, the title "I" is largely a reference to the fact that the band had intended the listeners to develop a personal connection with the album and to give the impression that the songs were being sung from the listener's perspective. "I" is also significant for being the most common letter of the alphabet in "Ikimonogakari" and (when pronounced phonetically) sounds not only like 愛 ai the Japanese for love but also 哀 ai the Japanese for sadness, a reference to the emotions the band hopes convey to the listeners.

Themes

Love is a common theme throughout the album, referenced frequently in "1 2 3 ~Koi ga Hajimaru~", "Koiato", "Nannde" and "Renaishousetsu". Whereas "1 2 3 ~Koi ga Hajimaru~", in keeping with previous singles such as "Kimagure Romantic" and "Natuzora Graffiti", describes the light-hearted and optimistic first love of a teenage girl, the others describe experiences of being broken hearted from various stages of adulthood, a theme which has rarely featured in recent Ikimono-gakari singles. "Ascending to the Capital" is also a common theme throughout later tracks, in particular "Tōkyō" and "Nukumori" where the theme is used as a metaphor to describe the emotions experienced by Yoshioka and Yamashita respectively in leaving their home town in Kanagawa prefecture behind to pursue a recording contract in the Japanese music industry. Various tracks hold individual references to the phonetic reading of the album title "I": "Koiato" references 逢い ai, the Japanese for meeting (often a loved one and often by chance) and "Kaze Koute Hana Yureru" refers to 藍 ai the Japanese for indigo.

Tie-ins 
Tie-ins to media and commercial products.
 "Kaze ga Fuiteiru" was the theme song for the NHK broadcasts of the London 2012 Summer Olympics.
 "Haru Uta" was the theme song for the 2012 anime film Detective Conan: The Eleventh Striker.
 "Egao" was the theme song for the 2013 Pokémon film ExtremeSpeed Genesect: Mewtwo Awakens.
 "1 2 3 ~Koi ga Hajimaru~ " was used as a commercial song for Calpis in March 2013.
 "My Sunshine Story" was used as a commercial song for the Nissan Serena from June 2013.

Tour

The release of the album was followed by a tour of Japan entitled "いきものがかりの みなさん、こんにつあー!! 2013 ～ I ～" (To all Ikimono-gakari fans, hello tour! 2013 ~I~). In August 2013, during the build up to the tour, Ikimono-gakari released four trailers on their official site which included: interviews with vocalist Kiyoe Yoshioka, leader Yoshiki Mizuno and recording engineer for the album Toshirō Kai; as well as footage from previous tours. A total of twenty-five concerts were held, the first concert being held at Sun Dome Fukui in Fukui on September 1, 2013 and the last in Sun Arena in Mie on December 7, 2013. Concerts were also be held at: Yokohama Arena (Yokohama), Sendai Sekisui-Heim Super Arena (Sendai), Osaka-jō Hall (Osaka), Fukuoka Convention Center (Fukuoka), Makomanai Ice Arena (Sapporo), Ehime Budōkan (Ehime), Hiroshima Green Arena (Hiroshima), World Memorial Hall (Kobe), Ecopa Arena (Shizuoka), Nippon Budokan (Tokyo) and Nippon Gaishi Hall (Nagoya). Prior to the tour, it was expected that the tour would attract a total audience of two hundred thousand across the twenty-five concerts.

Track listing

The source for romanized title tracks is Jpopasia.com (Source for track information: Ikimonogakari Official Site). English translations are unofficial.

Release history

Charts

Notes

References

External links
 

2013 albums
Ikimono-gakari albums
Albums produced by Seiji Kameda
Epic Records albums